Kelly Townsend (born September 27, 1968) is an American Republican  politician. She was a member of the Arizona Senate representing District 16 from 2021 to 2023, and previously was a member of the Arizona House of Representatives from 2013 to 2021, acting as Majority Whip from 2017 to 2018.

Early years
Townsend grew up in Oregon and served in the United States Navy as an aircraft mechanic. She received a Bachelor of Science degree in psychology and small business from Southern Oregon University.

Political career and electoral history

Greater Phoenix Tea Party

In 2010 Townsend was a member of the Greater Phoenix Tea Party. She first ran for the Arizona House of Representatives in a six-way Republican primary in District 22, placing fourth with 5,446 votes; The next year she campaigned for legislation requiring proof of citizenship as a prerequisite for ballot access. The legislation was passed by the Arizona State Legislature but vetoed by Governor Jan Brewer. In 2012 she was one of four candidates in District 16 for the Republican House of Representatives primary, placing first with 9,298 votes. She won the second seat in the five-way general election with 40,720 votes against Democratic nominee Matthew Cerra, Arizona Green Party candidate Bill Maher, and Democratic write-in candidate Cara Prior.

Arizona House of Representatives

In 2014, Townsend and fellow Arizona lawmakers were at the scene of the Bundy standoff, with Townsend characterizing the Federal government's response as reminiscent of Tiananmen Square. She subsequently won both the Republican Party primary and the general election, both with 39 percent of the vote.

In 2018 Townsend criticized semi-nude female women's rights activists, abortion and the "culture of death", the Arizona child welfare system, the furry community and opposed increased funding for education. That year she won the general election with 35.72 percent of the vote.

In 2019 she compared mandatory vaccination to Communism and the Holocaust, supported high school students who alleged they had been prevented from wearing "Make America Great Again" clothing and was accused of retaliation by a Facebook user who posted content critical of her. She likewise visited the Mexico-United States border in 2020 with Arizona Patriot group leaders that were subsequently banned from the House by Rusty Bowers.

In early 2020, leading up to the election, Townsend proposed legislation for a voter fraud hotline predicting possible foreign interference in the election.
She was a vocal supporter of election fraud theories, speaking at "Stop the Steal" movement rallies, advocating the independent state legislature theory and petitioning the United States Congress to accept 11 “alternate” presidential electors pledged to vote for Donald Trump or to nullify Arizona's electoral votes pending an audit. She participated in electoral fraud hearings held by the Arizona House, and subsequently introduced legislation to restrict the use of Sharpie brand markers to mark ballots and to establish a mandatory criminal procedures for allegations of election fraud pertaining to mailed ballots as well as election worker misconduct. She also made several public demands for law enforcement investigations of election workers. She likewise supported legislation that would require voters in Arizona who vote by mail to include identification paperwork along with their ballots. In 2018, she posited pipe bombs were a Democrat plot related to the upcoming election.

Arizona Senate

During her Senate tenure Townsend renewed her criticism of COVID-19 vaccines, comparing public service announcements on state highways to Communist Chinese propaganda and comparing those that complain about the unvaccinated to Nazis. She also supported parents protesting against local school boards, arguing that the National School Board Association and Federal Bureau of Investigation were attacking parents' rights. In 2022 she sponsored bills that would prohibit school districts from using tax dollars to pay their School Board Association membership dues and that would allow parents to use criminal and civil process for a teacher's violation of a parent's right to direct the education of his or her child. Townsend also supported legislation that would prohibit the teaching of critical race theory in schools. According to the Institute for Research and Education on Human Rights participates in social media groups that identify with sovereign citizen ideology as well as other far-right ideologies.

Townsend likewise proposed legislation relating to elections, proposing mandatory monthly reviews of the electoral roll and the prompt removal of felons from same, as well as prohibition of same-day voter registrations. In March 2022 she issued a subpoena to Maricopa County for the production of election information previously subpoenaed by the Arizona Attorney General. In May she called on supporters to monitor ballot drop boxes used for early voting in the 2022 elections for indications of electoral fraud.

Attempts to overturn the 2020 presidential election

In 2019, according to Townsend, she planned to meet with President Trump's lawyers to discuss anticipated voter fraud in the 2020 election.

In April 2019, Townsend visited the Mexico-United States border with Arizona Patriot group leaders Jennifer Harrison who published a video of the border visit on their social media page before she was banned from the House by Rusty Bowers for engaging in unwanted surveillance and harassment of Townsend's colleagues. In the video, of the border visit Townsend said her main concern was migrants arriving were registering to vote in federal elections.
 Afterward, Townsend published a separate video on her social media, anticipating voter fraud in the 2020 election alleging hundreds of noncitizen voters were coming into her district and others to vote illegally.

After the election, Trump lawyer Giuliani claimed he'd relied on information about noncitizen voters that he received from Townsend. Before the ballot count was finalized, Townsend asked for the resignation of the Maricopa County Republican Party chair, Rae Chornenky, alleging her inaction by not being present for the count “contributed to the collapse of Arizona voter confidence.” 

In July 2021, Townsend said to the Maricopa County Board of Supervisors in a video interview with Jordan Conradson from the Gateway Pundit, that it was their "come to Jesus moment," and that if they did not come forward to work with her and her associates on election integrity issues, they could be indicted or recalled. 

Senator Michelle Urgent-Rita alleges she was targeted after Townsend encouraged her supporters and a reporter to follow and harass her about her vote on election integrity bills.

Colleagues and private citizens allege Townsend instigates others to harass and target those who disagree with her or do not comply with her requests. 

Beginning in November 2020, she supported the removal of Rusty Bowers from office after he refused to support bringing the legislature into session to vote to send Trump electors to Congress for the 2020 election. In December 2020, Townsend tweeted the home address and phone number of Rusty Bowers which resulted in groups she was directly affiliated with protesting outside his home.
 Townsend stated she had a donor willing to pay 500K to support the efforts. America Restored, a group Townsend is closely allied with, funded the failed attempted recall of Rusty Bowers.

In 2019, Townsend helped establish the election integrity unit at the Arizona Attorney Generals' office, directed by Jennifer Wright, a lawyer who previously worked for Gregg Phillips (creator of election denying documentary 2000 Mules) at True the Vote.

In June 2022, Townsend received an FBI subpoena for emails and text messages relating to the Arizona Senate's examination of electoral fraud issues.

November 2022, she issued a subpoena for midterm records which the County rejected.

Opposition to House Speaker Rusty Bowers

Townsend was a vocal opponent of Arizona House Speaker Rusty Bowers when he refused to overturn the 2020 election she tweeted his home address for a protest, which was later deleted.  Townsend supported the recall effort of Bowers and when that failed, solicited David Farnsworth to oust him in the 2022 midterms successfully.

Purple For Parents and School Board Related Efforts

Throughout her term in office, Townsend closely aligns with and is supported by the group Purple for Parents, founded by her running mate Forest Moriarty who lost his bid in 2020.
The group was formed in opposition to the Teachers Red for Ed movement, which Townsend alleges frequently bullied her calling her an "idiot" and a "fruitcake."

Legislation aligned with the group includes a bill she sponsored in 2018 requiring the AG to investigate anytime House members or Senators believe a school district staff or board member may have violated state law and, if a violation is found, requires withholding of a portion of state funding. Also, in 2018, Townsend supported protestors at a rally outside a school for a student who stated he was bullied for wearing Trump attire. The following year, she sponsored legislation to stop what she described as potential political influence efforts in the classroom.

In 2021, Townsend supported activists who had been active in the election denial movement to take control of school board meetings related to COVID-19 restrictions and mask mandates. Later, in early 2022, she sponsored a bill defunding the Arizona School Boards Association, alleging the association engages in partisan lobbying and did not renounce its National Association when it took sides in political debate.

Townsend's bodyguard, Patriot Party leader Steve Daniels, was arrested outside a school board meeting during a protest, and she came to his defense asking for the police officer's body cam footage.

COVID-19 Mask Related

Townsend opposed mask mandates and vowed not to wear a mask while working at the Arizona Capitol.

Failed Congressional bid and defeat in State Senate primary

Townsend was a candidate in the 2022 Republican primary for Arizona's 6th congressional district before dropping out in March 2022 after failing to receive the endorsement of Donald Trump.

In 2022, Townsend said she gave up the Congress race and a much coveted Trump endorsement to fight Wendy Rogers for an Arizona Senate seat. Townsend lost the August 2022 District 7 State Senate primary to Rogers by a 59.7% to 40.3% margin.

Personal
Townsend was married to pilot Daniel Townsend, who died in a plane crash in 2009. She has three children.

References

External links

 Official campaign website
 Official page at the Arizona State Legislature
 

Place of birth missing (living people)
1968 births
Living people
Arizona State University alumni
Republican Party members of the Arizona House of Representatives
Politicians from Mesa, Arizona
Right-wing politics in the United States
Southern Oregon University alumni
Women state legislators in Arizona
21st-century American politicians
21st-century American women politicians